The Connections Museum (formerly the Herbert H. Warrick Jr. Museum of Communications, originally the Vintage Telephone Equipment Museum) is located in Centurylink's Duwamish Central Office at East Marginal Way S. and Corson Avenue S. in Georgetown, Seattle, Washington.  It "reveals the history of the telephone and the equipment that makes it all work." The museum was originally sponsored by the Washington Telephone Pioneers, and is now a part of the Telecommunications History Group, based in Denver, CO. It features vintage equipment from AT&T, Western Electric, Pacific Northwest Bell, USWest, and other organizations.

History 
The museum was founded by Don Ostrand and Herb Warrick, both employees of Pacific Northwest Bell. As a result of the Modification of Final Judgement in 1984, the AT&T monopoly was broken up, and an organizational mandate required Pacific Northwest Bell to modernize their aging telephone switching equipment. Realizing that this was perhaps the last opportunity to save examples of vintage electromechanical switches, Warrick requested that Pacific Northwest Bell (PNB) make arrangements to transfer ownership of selected equipment to the Telephone Pioneers and allow them to set up a museum somewhere in Seattle. Originally envisioned to be one of three telephone museums in the Pacific Northwest, this was the only one that materialized. Work started in 1985, and the museum opened to the public in Fall of 1989. Frames of electromechanical switching equipment were brought in from existing central offices, and lifted to the third floor by cranes. From there, volunteers rewired the equipment to make it functional once again.

In 2016 the museum was featured on a popular YouTube channel run by Tom Scott, as part of the "Things You Might Not Know" series.

Collection 

The museum has the following notable items in its collection:
 1923 Panel Switch from Seattle's Rainier/Parkway exchange
 1942 No. 1 Crossbar from Seattle's Lakeview exchange
 1958 No. 5 Crossbar from the Adams exchange on Mercer Island
 1976 3ESS electronic switching system from Crosby, WA
 North Electric CX 100, from Lester, Washington, originally installed in the U.S.S. California
 Step-By-Step (SXS) equipment
 750, 755 and 756 dial PBXs
 Teletype equipment from the 1920s through the 1980s
 A red K6 GPO telephone box, flown to Seattle from the UK

Most of the artifacts in the museum's collection are functional, and are maintained regularly by volunteers.  The electro-mechanical switching systems, particularly the No. 1 Crossbar and Panel offices, are the only remaining switches of their type in the world that are still functioning. The No.5 crossbar office is one of two that operate in a museum setting in the U.S. (the other is at The Telephone Museum in Ellsworth, Maine). Although they are no longer connected to the PSTN, visitors can make calls between the switches in the museum. A computer program has been set up to continually simulate calls and keep the equipment exercised.

References

External links

 Museum of Communications - Virtual tour
 2005 Visit to the Museum of Communication - Telephone World

Museums in Seattle
Museums established in 1985
Industry museums in Washington (state)
Media museums in Washington (state)
Telecommunications museums in the United States
Georgetown, Seattle
1985 establishments in Washington (state)